Brădățel may refer to several villages in Romania:

 Brădățel, a village in Pucheni Commune, Dâmbovița County
 Brădățel, a village in Burjuc Commune, Hunedoara County
 Brădățel, a village in Horodniceni Commune, Suceava County

See also 
 Brădet (disambiguation)
 Brădetu (disambiguation)
 Brădești (disambiguation)
 Brădeanca (disambiguation)